Heart's Delight is a settlement located near Barham in Kent, England.

There is a similarly-known settlement near Sittingbourne in the Swale district of Kent.

Villages in Kent